Ángel Fernández (born 22 July 1961) is a Spanish fencer. He competed in the épée events at the 1984, 1988 and 1992 Summer Olympics.

References

External links
 

1961 births
Living people
Spanish male épée fencers
Olympic fencers of Spain
Fencers at the 1984 Summer Olympics
Fencers at the 1988 Summer Olympics
Fencers at the 1992 Summer Olympics
Sportspeople from the Province of Toledo